Pasiphila furva is a species of moth in the family Geometridae. It is found in New Zealand.

References

Moths described in 1917
furva
Moths of New Zealand